The 1940 United States presidential election in Arizona took place on November 5, 1940, as part of the 1940 United States presidential election. State voters chose three representatives, or electors, to the Electoral College, who voted for president and vice president.

Arizona was won by incumbent President Franklin D. Roosevelt (D–New York), running with U.S. Secretary of Agriculture Henry A. Wallace, with 63.49% of the popular vote, against President of Commonwealth and Southern Wendell Willkie (R–New York), running with Senate Minority Leader Charles L. McNary, with 36.01% of the popular vote.

Results

Results by county

References

Arizona
1940
1940 Arizona elections